Neelasothaiyan Commander-in-Chief of King Periyathambiran
who ruled the city of Valavai,that he was born in the Vannar clan and conquered the Pandyas and conquered 6000 warriors in his army and ruled their country.

References

Indian warriors
Sri Lankan Tamil history
Tamil monarchs
Sri Lankan Hindus
Sri Lankan Tamil rebels